Ohio Music Education Association, National Association for Music Education
 Open Source Business Alliance, nonprofit organization